Judge Marquez may refer to:

Alfredo Chavez Marquez (1922–2014), judge of the United States District Court for the District of Arizona
Rosemary Márquez (born 1968), judge of the United States District Court for the District of Arizona

See also
Justice Marquez (disambiguation)